This is an incomplete list of statutory instruments of the United Kingdom in 1947.  This listing is the complete, 1 (one) item, "Partial dataset" as listed on www.legislation.gov.uk (as at March 2014).

1947-1948 saw the coming into force of the Statutory Instruments Act 1946 which mandated statutory instruments. Prior to this act Statutory Rules and Orders fulfilled a similar function and they formed the secondary legislation of England, Scotland and Wales prior to 1948.

Statutory instrument
 The House to House Collections Regulations 1947 SI 1947/2662

See also
 List of Statutory Instruments of the United Kingdom

References

External links
 Legislation.gov.uk delivered by the UK National Archive
 UK SI's on legislation.gov.uk
 UK Draft SI's on legislation.gov.uk

Lists of Statutory Instruments of the United Kingdom
Statutory Instruments